Anthony Quinn Edwards (born May 26, 1966) is a former professional American football wide receiver in the National Football League for the Philadelphia Eagles and the Phoenix/Arizona Cardinals.  He played college football at New Mexico Highlands University.

1966 births
Living people
People from Casa Grande, Arizona
Sportspeople from the Phoenix metropolitan area
American football wide receivers
New Mexico Highlands Cowboys football players
Philadelphia Eagles players
Phoenix Cardinals players
Arizona Cardinals players
Ed Block Courage Award recipients